Joni Mäki (born 24 January 1995) is a Finnish cross-country skier. He is a silver medalist in the team sprint at both the 2022 Winter Olympics and the 2021 World Championships.

Career
As a junior, Mäki won bronze in the sprint event at the 2014 U20 World Championships in Val di Fiemme. He made his World Cup debut in 2014 and placed in the top thirty for the first time in January 2016. So far, he has three podiums in the World Cup, one from team sprint (Planica 2020) and one from relay (Lahti 2021), and his best individual result is a 2nd place at the classical sprint in the 2021-22 season finale in Falun.

In 2019, at his first World Championships in Seefeld, Mäki placed 13th in the freestyle sprint event, being the first athlete not to qualify into the semi-finals. In the 2021 World Championships in Oberstdorf, he again placed thirteenth in the individual sprint, held this time in the classic style. Only three days later, though, Mäki won his first World Championships medal when he and teammate Ristomatti Hakola placed second at the team sprint event. Mäki secured them the silver medal with a solid last leg, where he lost to Norwegian Johannes Høsflot Klæbo but overtook the Russian Gleb Retivykh, who had had a head start in the beginning of the last leg. In the 4 x 10 kilometre relay, he placed sixth along with teammates Hakola, Iivo Niskanen and Perttu Hyvärinen, with whom he'd reached the podium in Lahti earlier in the season.

Mäki started his 2021-22 season well, succeeding in domestic competitions. He followed this by reaching his first World Cup sprint final in the classical sprint event in Ruka, where he finished sixth. In the weeks after, though, he began suffering from health problems and missed the Tour de Ski, among other World Cup events. Mäki was again in good form in the Beijing Olympics, reaching the final in the freestyle sprint. Mäki, who has never reached a freestyle sprint final in World Cup competitions, placed fourth, only a second short of the bronze medal. In the classical team sprint, Mäki won his first Olympic medal when he and the 15-kilometre Olympic champion Iivo Niskanen took the silver medal. In the final sprint of the World Cup season at Falun, Mäki reached his first individual WC podium when he placed second after Sprint World Cup winner Richard Jouve.

Mäki has recently won several medals in Finnish National Championships and represents Pohti Ski Team in national competitions. He won the 2020-21 Suomen Cup, Finland's highest-level domestic cross-country competition tournament.

Cross-country skiing results
All results are sourced from the International Ski Federation (FIS).

Olympic Games
1 medal (1 silver)

Distance reduced to 30 km due to weather conditions.

World Championships
1 medal – (1 silver)

World Cup

Season standings

Individual podiums
 1 podium – (1 , 0 )

Team podiums
2 podiums  – (1 , 1 )

References

External links

Living people
1995 births
Finnish male cross-country skiers
Sportspeople from Vaasa
FIS Nordic World Ski Championships medalists in cross-country skiing
Cross-country skiers at the 2022 Winter Olympics
Olympic cross-country skiers of Finland
Medalists at the 2022 Winter Olympics
Olympic silver medalists for Finland
Olympic medalists in cross-country skiing
21st-century Finnish people